Josep Pons may refer to:

Josep Maria Pons Irazazábal (born 1948), Spanish diplomat; brother of Félix Pons
Josep Pons (born 1957), Spanish orchestra conductor
Josep Pons Rosell (1918–2013), Spanish physical anthropologist and professor